Baron Rossmore, of Monaghan in the County of Monaghan, is a title in the Peerage of Ireland. It was created in 1796 for the soldier Robert Cuninghame, with remainder to his wife Elizabeth's nephews Henry Alexander Jones (the son of Theophilus Jones and Anne Murray, eldest sister of Elizabeth; Henry Alexander Jones died childless before his uncle Lord Rossmore) and Warner William Westenra, son of Henry Westenra and Harriet Murray, youngest sister of Elizabeth. Cuninghame was a General in the Army and served as Commander-in-Chief of Ireland. From January to August 1801 he also sat in the House of Lords as an Irish Representative Peer.

Lord Rossmore died childless (his death gave rise to the legend of the Rossmore banshee) and was succeeded according to the special remainder by his nephew Warner William Westenra, the second Baron. He represented Monaghan in the British House of Commons and also served as Lord Lieutenant of Monaghan from 1831 to 1842. In 1838 he was created Baron Rossmore, of the County of Monaghan, in the Peerage of the United Kingdom. This gave the barons an automatic seat in the House of Lords. His eldest son, Henry Robert Westenra, the third Baron, represented Monaghan in Parliament as a Whig and was Lord Lieutenant of Monaghan from 1843 to 1852. Henry's younger son, the fifth Baron (who succeeded his elder unmarried brother), was Lord Lieutenant of Monaghan from 1897 to 1921.  the titles are held by the latter's great-grandson, the eighth Baron, who succeeded his father in that year.

The Westenra family is of Dutch descent. Warner Westenra (died 1676) immigrated to Dublin and became an Irish subject. The seat of the Barons Rossmore was Rossmore Castle, County Monaghan. Warner Westenra, grandfather of the second Baron, represented Maryborough in the Irish Parliament. Henry Westenra, father of the second Baron, represented County Monaghan in the Irish Parliament. The Honourable John Westenra, third son of the second Baron, was Member of Parliament for King's County.

The family seat was Rossmore Park, near Monaghan, County Monaghan, in Ireland.

Baron Rossmore (1796, 1838)

Robert Cuninghame, 1st Baron Rossmore (1726–1801)
Warner William Westenra, 2nd Baron Rossmore (1765–1842)
Henry Robert Westenra, 3rd Baron Rossmore (1792–1860)
Henry Cairnes Westenra, 4th Baron Rossmore (1851–1874)
Derrick Warner William Westenra, 5th Baron Rossmore (1853–1921)
William Westenra, 6th Baron Rossmore (1892–1958)
William Warner Westenra, 7th Baron Rossmore (1931–2021) 
  Benedict William Westenra, 8th Baron Rossmore (b. 1983)

There is currently no heir to the title.

References

Baronies in the Peerage of Ireland
Peerages created with special remainders
Noble titles created in 1796
1796 establishments in Ireland
Baronies in the Peerage of the United Kingdom
Noble titles created in 1838
Noble titles created for UK MPs